Euodia robusta is a species of plant in the family Rutaceae. It is a tree found in Peninsular Malaysia and Singapore. It is threatened by habitat loss.

References

robusta
Trees of Malaya
Conservation dependent plants
Taxonomy articles created by Polbot
Taxa named by Joseph Dalton Hooker